The WWE United States Championship is a professional wrestling championship contested in the American promotion WWE on the Raw brand. It was originally known as the NWA United States Heavyweight Championship and began as a regional championship created by and defended in Jim Crockett Jr.'s Mid-Atlantic Championship Wrestling, a territory of the National Wrestling Alliance (NWA). Harley Race became the inaugural champion on the title's introduction on January 1, 1975. Turner Broadcasting bought Mid-Atlantic in November 1988 and renamed it World Championship Wrestling (WCW) after its primary television program.

In March 2001, the then-WWF bought selected assets of WCW. This resulted in the WCW United States Heavyweight Championship becoming a championship for the WWF, which referred to it as the WCW United States Championship. At Survivor Series in November 2001, the WCW United States and WWF Intercontinental Championships were unified, resulting in the United States Championship being deactivated. In July 2003, the title was reactivated as the WWE United States Championship. It is the only active WWE championship not created by the promotion. Since the 2019 WWE Superstar Shake-up, it has been exclusively contested on the Raw brand.

The championship is contested in professional wrestling matches, in which participants execute scripted finishes rather than contend in direct competition. Some reigns were held by champions using a ring name, while others used their real name. Austin Theory is the current champion in his second reign. He defeated former champion Seth "Freakin" Rollins and Bobby Lashley in a triple threat match at Survivor Series WarGames on November 26, 2022 in Boston, Massachusetts.

Overall, there have been 101 different champions. Ric Flair holds the record for having the most reigns at six, while John Cena holds the record for most reigns under the WWE banner at five. Chris Benoit is also tied with John Cena with five, two from WCW and three from WWE. Lex Luger holds the longest reign, with his third reign lasting 523 days, while Dean Ambrose holds the longest reign under the WWE banner at 351 days (overall the third longest in the title's history). "Stunning" Steve Austin's second reign was the shortest, lasting approximately five minutes. Only two men, Lex Luger and Rick Rude, have held the championship continuously for one year (365 days) or more.

Title history

Names

Reigns

Combined reigns 

{|class="wikitable sortable" style="text-align: center" 
|-
!Rank
!Wrestler
!No. ofreigns
!Combineddays
!Combined daysrec. by WWE
|-
!1
| || 5 || colspan=2|950
|-
!2
| || 5(6) || 773 || 709
|-
!3
| || 2(3) || 512 || 392
|-
!4
| || 3(4) || 509 || 500
|-
!5
| || 2 || colspan=2|419
|-
!6
| || 5 || 403 || 405
|-
!7
| || 1 || colspan=2|378
|-
!8
| || 3 || 362 || 360
|-
!9
| || 5 || colspan=2|357
|-
!10
|  || 1 || colspan=2|351
|-
!11
| || 1 || colspan=2|328
|-
!12
| || 3 || 324 || 323
|-
!13
| || 2 || colspan=2|321
|-
!14
| || 3 || 312 || 303
|-
!15
| || 2 || colspan=2|305
|-
!16
| || 2 || 302 || 274
|-
!17
| || 5 || 296 || 300
|-
!18
| || 1 || colspan=2|283
|-
!19
| || 4 || 271 || 266
|-
!20
| || 4 || 265 || 267
|-
!21
| || 2 || colspan=2|257
|-
!rowspan=2|22
| || 2 || colspan=2|240
|-
| || 1 || 240 || 243
|-
!24
| || 1 || colspan=2|239
|-
!25
| || 2 || colspan=2|234
|-
!26
| || 1 || 231 || 233
|-
!27
| || 3 || colspan=2|225 
|-
!28
| || 3 || 220 || 222
|-
!29
| || 3 || colspan=2|209
|-
!rowspan=2|30
| || 2 || 191 || 189
|-
| || 1 || colspan=2|191
|-
!32
|style="background:#ffe6bd;"| † || 2 || colspan=2|+
|-
!33
| || 5 || colspan=2|186
|-
!34
| || 3 || colspan=2|184
|-
!35
| || 1 || colspan=2|183
|-
!36
| || 1 || 176 || 177
|-
!37
| || 1 || 173 || 171
|-
!38
| || 2 || colspan=2|169
|-
!39
| || 1 || colspan=2|167
|-
!40
| || 2 || colspan=2|161
|-
!41
| || 1 || colspan=2|160
|-
!42
| || 2 || 158 || 165
|-
!43
| || 2(3) || 156 || 150
|-
!44
| || 1 || 151 || 150
|-
!rowspan=2|45
| || 2 || colspan=2 rowspan=2|147
|-
| || 1 
|-
!47
| || 1 || colspan=2|141
|-
!48
| || 1 || colspan=2|130
|-
!49
| || 1 || colspan=2|129
|-
!50
| || 2 || 120 || 122
|-
!51
| || 3 || 118 || 115
|-
!52
| || 1 || 106 || 107
|-
!53
| || 1 || colspan=2|104
|-
!54
| || 1 || colspan=2|100
|-
!55
| || 1 || 97 || 96
|-
!56
| || 3 || colspan=2|96
|-
!57
| || 2 || 95 || 93
|-
!58
| || 1 || colspan=2|93
|-
!rowspan=2|59
| || 2 || 90 || 89
|-
| || 1 || colspan=2|90
|-
!61
| || 1 || colspan=2|88
|-
!rowspan=2|62
| || 2 || colspan=2|85
|-
| || 1 || colspan=2|85
|-
!64
| || 1 || colspan=2|84
|-
!65
| || 2 || 78 || 90
|-
!66
| || 2 || colspan=2|75
|-
!67
| || 1 || colspan=2|70
|-
!68
| || 2 || colspan=2|66
|-
!69
| || 2 || 61 || 64
|-
!70
| || 2 || 56 || 55
|-
!71
| || 1 || colspan=2|54
|-
!72
| || 1 || 51 || 54
|-
!73
| || 1 || colspan=2|50
|-
!rowspan=4|74
||| 1 || 49 || 50
|-
| || rowspan=2| 1 || rowspan=2| 49 || rowspan=2| 48
|-
|
|-
| || 1 || colspan=2|49
|-
!78
| || 1 || 48 || 46
|-
!79
| || 2 || 46 || 45
|-
!80
| || 1 || colspan=2|44
|-
!rowspan=3|81
| ||rowspan=3|1 || colspan=2 rowspan=3|42
|-
| 
|-
|
|-
!84
| || 1 || colspan=2|41
|-
!85
| || 1 || colspan=2|35
|-
!86
| || 1 || colspan=2|33
|-
!rowspan=2|87
| || 1 || colspan=2|29
|-
| || 1 || colspan=2|29
|-
!89
| || 1 || colspan=2|28
|-
!90
| || 1 || colspan=2|25
|-
!rowspan=2|91
| || 1 || colspan=2|22
|-
| || 1 || colspan=2|22
|-
!rowspan=3|93
| || 1 || colspan=2|21
|-
| || 1 || 21 || 22
|-
| || 1 ||colspan=2|21
|-
!96
| || 2 || 19 || 20
|-
!97
| || 1 || colspan=2|15
|-
!98
| || 1 || colspan=2|13
|-
!99
| || 1 || colspan=2|8
|-
!100
| || 1 || colspan=2|6
|-
!101
| || 1 || colspan=2|1

Notes

References

External links 
 Official WWE United States Championship Title History
 NWA/WCW United States Heavyweight Championship Title History at Wrestling-Titles.com (1975–2001)
 WWE United States Championship Title History at Wrestling-Titles.com (2001 – present)

National Wrestling Alliance championships
Jim Crockett Promotions championships
WWE championships lists
World Championship Wrestling champions lists